The 1977–78 Boston Bruins season was the Bruins' 54th season in the NHL. The Bruins advanced to the Stanley Cup Finals for the second straight season only to be defeated again by their rivals, the Montreal Canadiens. The season featured the memorable moment of John Wensink challenging the entire Minnesota North Stars bench to a fight during a December contest.

Offseason

NHL Draft

Regular season
The 1977–78 Bruins set an NHL record by having 11 different skaters score 20 goals or more in a season. The eleven skaters are:
Peter McNab
Terry O'Reilly
Bobby Schmautz
Stan Jonathan
Jean Ratelle
Rick Middleton
Wayne Cashman
Gregg Sheppard
Brad Park
Don Marcotte
Bob Miller

Season standings

Schedule and results

Season summary
December 1: Following a fight with Alex Pirus, John Wensink skates over to the Minnesota bench and challenges the entire team but no player responds.

Player statistics

Regular season
Scoring

Goaltending

Playoffs
Scoring

Goaltending

Playoffs

Stanley Cup finals

Montreal wins the series 4–2.

Larry Robinson won the Conn Smythe Trophy as playoff MVP.

Awards and records
 Don Cherry, Runner-Up, Jack Adams Trophy
 Brad Park, Defenceman, NHL First Team All-Star

References
 Bruins on Hockey Database

Boston Bruins seasons
Boston Bruins
Boston Bruins
Adams Division champion seasons
Boston Bruins
Boston Bruins
Bruins
Bruins